The 2010 Slamdance Film Festival took place in Park City, Utah from January 21 to January 28, 2010. It was the 16th iteration of the Slamdance Film Festival, an alternative to the more mainstream Sundance Film Festival.

For the 2010 Festival, Slamdance received a record number of over 5,000 submissions and programmed 91 films and concluded with an Awards Ceremony at Red Banjo Pizza on Main Street. 

New for 2010, a new distribution partnership with Microsoft was announced where four films that screened at the festival would go live on both Zune and Xbox LIVE platforms. Documentary Features “American Jihadist” and “Mind of the Demon: The Larry Linkogle Story,” and Narrative Features “The Scenesters” and “The Wild Hunt” will be available for a seven-day period for movie fans to rent though their computers or on Xbox LIVE until February 2, 2010.

Awards
There are three competitive divisions at this year's festival, the Grand Jury, Audience Awards and Special Sponsored Awards provided by Kodak, Dos Equis and Lonely Seal Releasing. The Grand Jury and Audience Award winning films will be screened in several domestic venues throughout the year, including the IFC Center in New York City. The Feature competitions are limited to first-time filmmakers working with production budgets of $1 million or less.

References

External links
 Official Site
 Exclusive: Slamdance 2010 Report

Slamdance Film Festival
Slamdance Film Festival
Slamdance Film Festival
Slamdance
2010 in American cinema